Milly Shapiro is an American actress and singer. She starred in the 2018 horror film Hereditary and the 2013 Broadway production of Matilda the Musical playing the role of Matilda Wormwood. She also played Sally Brown in an Off-Broadway production of You're a Good Man, Charlie Brown. In 2021, Shapiro and Spencer Arjang co-created the band AFTERxCLASS.

Awards
Shapiro won a Tony Honor in 2013 with Sophia Gennusa, Bailey Ryon, and Oona Laurence for her Broadway debuts in Matilda, making her the youngest recipients of the award in history. In 2013, Shapiro was also nominated for the Grammy for "Best Musical Theater Album" for the musical's cast album.

Personal life
Shapiro is the younger sister of Abi Monterey, who is also an actress as well as a stuntwoman. The siblings perform together as the Shapiro Sisters.

Along with her sister and mother, Shapiro was born with cleidocranial dysostosis.

Milly is also a lesbian and uses she/they pronouns as shown on her profiles on several social media sites.

Discography

Filmography

Theatre

Film

Television

References

Sources
Torch solo, then jammy time, New York Times
Debut of the Month: Four Young Stars of Matilda: The Musical, Broadway World

External links
 
 

2002 births
21st-century American actresses
Actresses from Tampa, Florida
American child actresses
American musical theatre actresses
Living people